Nessetal is a municipality in the district of Gotha, in Thuringia, Germany. It was created with effect from 1 January 2019 by the merger of the former municipalities of Ballstädt, Brüheim, Bufleben, Friedrichswerth, Goldbach, Haina, Hochheim, Remstädt, Wangenheim, Warza and Westhausen. The name refers to the river Nesse.

References

Municipalities in Thuringia
Gotha (district)